As of 2017, there were at least 305 breeds of domestic rabbit in 70 countries around the world. A rabbit breed is a distinct variety created through selective breeding (or occasionally natural selection) for specific characteristics, including size, fur (length, quality, or color), feed conversion ratio, climate adaptability, or temperament. Groups such as the American Rabbit Breeders Association (ARBA) and the British Rabbit Council (BRC) coordinate and standardize the desired qualities of their recognized breeds, through promotion and exhibition. Each rabbit breed is considered to benefit when a reputable breeder strives to emulate the purpose for the breed, often defined by the individual breed standard by which it may be judged. The global diversity of breeds reflects the breadth of the rabbit's unique qualities. Listed below are 191 of the world's modern-day rabbit breeds.

Modern-day rabbit breeds 

* indicates "Rabbits in COUNTRY or TERRITORY" links.

Scope 
The table of modern-day rabbit breeds includes those that are:

 recognized as a distinct breed by ARBA, the BRC, or another country's established organization for the national promotion of rabbit breeds,
 recognized as "in development" for potential formal recognition (as judged by multiple authoritative sources), or
 recognized as a distinct breed that resulted from natural selection (as judged by pertinent authoritative sources).

Terminology

Confusion sometimes arises regarding the name of a rabbit breed versus the name of a rabbit's color/pattern (or fur type). For example, Harlequin is the name of a breed whose color/pattern is known as harlequin. (This usage may have arisen from the Harlequin character, who, like this rabbit, always wears a motley-colored check-patterned coat—and suggests that the rabbit may be equally impish.) The harlequin color/pattern is found now in a different breed of rabbit: the Tri-Colour Dutch, also known as the Harlequin Dutch. Such evolutions in terminology pertain also to some fur types, where (for example) the Rex breed has rex fur, one new variety of which appears in the unusually "rexed" Astrex rabbit breed.

It is sometimes difficult to ascertain which came first, the breed name or the color/pattern name (or fur-type name).  What is certain is that in such situations the two at some point were synonymous but subsequent developments in other breeds (likely hinging on similar genetic changes) have caused the terms to diverge.

The definition of a distinct breed relies on clusters of complex individual gene-sets—clusters that may include the gene-set for a body type, the gene-set for an ear type, the gene-set for a color/pattern, and/or the gene-set for a fur type.  The determination of when a group of rabbits is considered to have become a new breed (as a result of overarching genetic distinction) is left, in the following table, to the authority of ARBA, the BRC, or other reputable source.

Extinct rabbit breeds 

Certain rabbit breeds, though now extinct, contributed strongly to the development of a modern-day breed. Little may be known of the extinct breed and in some cases the only records are extracts in old breed books.

Explanatory footnotes

Citation footnotes

See also

"Alba", a genetically modified "glowing" rabbit
Animal coloration, reasons and mechanisms
Brachycephalic, mesaticephalic, and dolichocephalic rabbit breeds
Disruptive selection, a form of natural selection (with a rabbit example)
Dwarf rabbit, regarding the smallest rabbit breeds
Fur attributes in rabbits
Genetics–Linkage maps in the domestic rabbit
Genetics–Color genes in the domestic rabbit
Lop rabbit, regarding ear carriage in rabbits
Point coloration in rabbit breeds

References

Further reading
 The Official Guide Book Raising Better Rabbits and Cavies, from the American Rabbit Breeders Association, Inc.
 Rabbitlopaedia - A complete guide to Rabbit Care, by Meg Brown & Virginia Richardson, Ringpress

External links

 American Rabbit Breeders Association (ARBA) (Includes links to national rabbit breed clubs in the US)
 British Rabbit Council (BRC) (Includes links to national rabbit breed clubs in the UK)
 Online Rabbit Care—Rabbit Breeds (Lists over 150 rabbit varieties)
 RabbitPedia.com—Rabbit Breeds (Information about 60+ Pet Rabbit Breeds from A to Z)
 Petadvices.com—Domestic Rabbit Breeds (Information about Domestic Rabbit Animal Breeds)
 Complete Guide of Rabbit Breeds - List of rabbit breeds approved by American Rabbit Breeders Association
 RabbitBreeders.us—Rabbit Breeds (Includes body-type and fur-type classifications for over 45 ARBA-recognized rabbit breeds)
 Raising-Rabbits—Rabbit Breeds (Lists over 170—and provides information on over 50—"global domestic" rabbit breeds)

Rabbits
 
Rabbits as pets